Morton is a village in the civil parish of Fiskerton cum Morton, within Nottinghamshire, England. It is located 1 mile west of Fiskerton, and is part of the civil parish of Fiskerton cum Morton.
The parish church of St Denis was built in 1756.

References

External links

Villages in Nottinghamshire
Newark and Sherwood